Communion Music is a British independent music company that includes a record label, a music publisher, a concert promoter and a tour promoter.  Founded in 2006, Communion Music has offices in London and Brooklyn, New York.  Its companies include Communion Records, Communion Presents, and Communion Publishing.

Communion Music artists include Tamino, Sam Fender, Bastille & Lewis Capaldi, Dan Croll, Michael Kiwanuka, Catfish and the Bottlemen, Ben Howard, James Bay, George Ezra, Bear's Den, Nathaniel Rateliff and the Night Sweats, Daughter and Highly Suspect.

History
Communion Music was founded by musicians Kevin Jones (Bears Den), Ben Lovett (Mumford and Sons) and producer Ian Grimble. It began in 2006 as Communion Clubnight, a monthly live music performance at London's Notting Hill Arts Club. 

Frustrated by what they felt was an overly competitive and often artist-unfriendly live music scene in London, the founders wanted to create a music platform in an environment that was creative, collaborative and respectful.

Communion Records
Communion Records initially started as a record label for the groups involved in Communion Clubnight. Its first release was a compilation album, Communion. Released as a limited edition 12" vinyl, Communion featured previously unheard recordings by Mumford and Sons, J J Pistolet (Justin Young of the Vaccines), Johnny Flynn, Alessi's Ark and Peggy Sue. It also featured Elena Tonra (Daughter), Andrew Davie (Bears Den) and Matthew Hegarty (Matthew and the Atlas).

In 2010, Communion Records released its first artist release, Matthew and the Atlas's To the North EP . It then released debut EPs and singles by Michael Kiwanuka, Ben Howard, Gotye, Daughter, Matt Corby, Marcus Foster, and Nathaniel Rateliff.  Grimble often served as producer and Jones play with the artists in the studio or live.

Under a two-year partnership with Island Records, Communion Records released albums by Deap Vally, Edward Sharpe and the Magnetic Zeros, Half Moon Run and Catfish and the Bottlemen.  The Bottlemen debut album, The Balcony, sold approximately 400,000 copies worldwide and saw the band winning a 2016 Brit Award for Best British Breakthrough.

In 2015, Communion Records signed a new distribution deal with Universal Music's Caroline International, under which it released music by Bear's Den, Joseph J Jones, Rukhsana Merrise, Banfi, Syd Arthur, Foreign Fields, and Matthew and the Atlas.

In 2021, Communion Records partnered with So Young Magazine to create So Young Records, home to Folly Group, Lime Garden, VLURE and more.

Communion Records US
In 2012, Communion launched its sister label, Communion Records US, under Ben Lovett. Initially distributed by Sony RED and now by Capitol Music Group, it has signed and released records by Tennis, Willy Mason and Rubblebucket, as well as being the US label for Bear's Den, Catfish and the Bottlemen and Matthew and the Atlas.

Compilations
Communion Records has released three other compilations.
 The Flowerpot Sessions (May 2011), which was the product of a week-long collaboration between 23 artists. Communion took over the now-closed North London pub for a week, and facilitated a week of live performances, writing sessions and recording on-site. Artists included Angus and Julia Stone, Damien Rice, Mt Desolation, Lissie and Marcus Foster.
 New Faces (March 2012) Communion's third compilation, New Faces' was a cherry-picked selection of music that Communion was excited about – a look back at the previous year's best new music, and a look forward to what was coming next year. It featured artists including Michael Kiwanuka, Matt Corby, Bear's Den, Dan Croll and Joe Banfi.
 Commun10n'' (March 2016) was released to mark the 10th anniversary of Communion. Released as a very limited 12" vinyl, side one features a best of Communion Records previous releases, and side two features a selection of new artists on the roster. It was released in conjunction with Record Store Day.

Communion Presents
Communion Presents is an independent concert promoter in London. Like Communion Records, it emerged from the Communion Clubnight,  It represents approximately 150 artists, including James Bay, Ben Howard, George Ezra, Michael Kiwanuka, Half Moon Run, Matt Corby, Jack Garratt, Bear's Den, The Staves, Frances, Nathaniel Rateliff and the Night Sweats and Chet Faker.

Festivals
Communion Presents has its own 1500 capacity festival in Shepherds Bush called "Bushstock". Focused on new and emerging talent, it takes place in June across multiple venues in the Shepherds Bush area.

Communion Presents is also a partner in Citadel Festival, a one-day event in Victoria Park in London that launched in July 2015 with Ben Howard as its first headliner.

Tours
Communion Presents has produced a number of tours, most notably the Austin to Boston tour of March 2012, which was made into an award-winning documentary of the same name.

It also produces a bi-annual tour in the UK called "New Faces" which features four emerging artists on a rotating line up.

Radio
Communion Presents also curates a weekly new music show on UK indie radio station Radio X . It airs on Sunday evenings from 10 pm and is hosted by Maz Tappuni.

Communion Publishing
Communion Publishing is an independent music publisher, administered by Kobalt. Writers on the roster include Catfish and the Bottlemen, Bear's Den, Foreign Fields, Banfi, Joseph J Jones, Matt Hegarty and Richard Frennaux.

References

External links
Official website
Bushstock website
Flowerpot communionmusic

Record labels based in London